Resourcesat-1 (also known as IRS-P6) is an advanced remote sensing satellite built by Indian Space Research Organization (ISRO). The tenth satellite of ISRO in IRS series, Resourcesat-1 is intended to not only continue the remote sensing data services provided by IRS-1C and IRS-1D, both of which have far outlived their designed mission lives, but also vastly enhance the data quality.

Launch 
The 1360 kg Resourcesat-1 was launched into an 817 km high polar Sun-synchronous orbit by the eighth flight of India's Polar Satellite Launch Vehicle (PSLV-C5).

Instruments 
Resourcesat-1 carries three cameras  similar to those of IRS-1C and IRS-1D but with vastly improved spatial resolutions - a high resolution Linear Imaging Self-Scanning Sensor-4 (LISS-4) operating in three spectral bands in the Visible and Near Infrared Region (VNIR) with 5.8 metre spatial resolution and steerable up to 26° across track to obtain stereoscopic imagery and achieve five-day revisit capability; a medium resolution Linear Imaging Self-Scanning Sensor-3 (LISS-3) operating in three spectral bands in VNIR and one in Short Wave Infrared (SWIR) band with 23.5 metre spatial resolution; and an Advanced Wide Field Sensor (AWiFS) operating in three spectral bands in VNIR and one band in SWIR with 56 metre spatial resolution.

Resourcesat-1 also carries a solid state recorder with a capacity of 120 Gigabits to store the images taken by its cameras which can be read out later to the ground stations.

See also 

 List of Indian satellites
 Resourcesat-2

References 

Spacecraft launched in 2003
Earth observation satellites of India
2003 in India
Spacecraft launched by PSLV rockets